The Pontiac Storage Facility is a former storage facility of the United States Army that stored equipment for the Detroit Arsenal located in Pontiac, Michigan. It was closed as part of the 1988 Base Realignment and Closure Commission.

References

Buildings and structures in Pontiac, Michigan
Closed installations of the United States Army
1988 disestablishments in Michigan